Camila Carraro Mendes (born June 29, 1994) is an American actress and singer. She made her debut portraying Veronica Lodge on The CW teen drama series Riverdale (2017–present), for which she won the Teen Choice Award for Choice Scene Stealer in 2017. She has appeared as Morgan Cruise in the romantic comedy The New Romantic (2018), the Netflix original films The Perfect Date (2019), Dangerous Lies (2020), and Do Revenge (2022), as well as the critically acclaimed Hulu sci-fi comedy Palm Springs (2020).

Early life
Mendes was born on June 29, 1994, in Charlottesville, Virginia,  to Brazilian parents. Her father, Victor Mendes, is a business executive and her mother, Gisele Carraro, is a flight attendant. She has an older sister. Shortly after her birth, she moved to Atlanta, Georgia, then back to Virginia, and then to Orlando, Florida. Due to her father's job and later, her parents' divorce, she moved 16 times growing up, but mainly lived in Florida. At the age of 10, she lived in Brazil, for a year. Mendes attended the Fine Arts program at the American Heritage School in Plantation, Florida,  graduating in 2012. In May 2016, Mendes graduated from New York University Tisch School of the Arts. While there, she also became friends with singer Maggie Rogers.

Career
Mendes' first acting job was a commercial for IKEA. In 2016, Mendes was cast as "silver-tongued high school sophomore" Veronica Lodge in The CW's teen drama series Riverdale, a subversive take on the Archie Comics. Mendes was represented by the Carson Kolker Organization, later changing to CAA. She appeared on the cover of Women's Health in December 2017 and Cosmopolitan in February 2018.

Mendes made her feature film debut as Morgan in The New Romantic, which premiered at the SXSW Festival in March 2018. In the same month, Mendes joined the cast of the romantic comedy The Perfect Date alongside Laura Marano and Matt Walsh. The film was released on Netflix on April 12, 2019. In 2019, the film Coyote Lake premiered, in which Mendes is the lead. In 2020 she appeared in the critically acclaimed sci-fi/comedy Palm Springs, which premiered at the Sundance Film Festival and was released that July on Hulu. She subsequently headlined the Netflix thriller film Dangerous Lies, released that same year.

Personal life
When auditioning for characters of Latin American background, she has been told "You don't look Latina enough." Mendes is Brazilian American and identifies as Latin American. She speaks Portuguese.

 Mendes stated that she was "roofied and sexually assaulted" during her time at NYU, which inspired her to get a tattoo representing her commitment to build stability and safety for herself.

Mendes dated photographer and director Ian Wallace from 2013 to 2017. Mendes had begun dating Riverdale co-star Charles Melton by October 2018; they broke up by December 2019.

Filmography

Film

Television

Music videos

Awards and nominations

References

External links 

 
 

1994 births
Living people
21st-century American actresses
Actresses from Charlottesville, Virginia
American people of Brazilian descent
American television actresses
American film actresses
American voice actresses
Actresses from Florida
Tisch School of the Arts alumni
Actresses of Brazilian descent
American Heritage School (Florida) alumni
Brazilian actors
Brazilian American